International Mathematics Research Surveys was a peer reviewed academic journal of mathematics. It published surveys of the state of research in different aspects of mathematics, identifying trends and open problems. It was published by Oxford University Press from 2005 until 2008.

The last editor was Morris Weisfeld of Duke University.

References 

Oxford University Press academic journals
Mathematics journals
Publications disestablished in 2008